The Youjiao clan (有蟜氏) was a Chinese clan that existed during the Three Sovereigns and Five Emperors period. It is traditionally attributed as the clan of Fubao, who is the mother of the Yellow Emperor. The clan lived in Pingfeng Mountain (平逢山) in Luoyang, and had a bee as their totem for generations in Song County. The earliest record about the clan can be found in the Classic of Mountains and Seas. Pingfeng is an old name of "Mang mountain (邙山)" in the region of Luoyang,

Notes

Chinese clans
Chinese mythology